The 1943 Cork Senior Hurling Championship was the 55th staging of the Cork Senior Hurling Championship since its establishment by the Cork County Board in 1887. The draw for the opening round fixtures took place at the Cork Convention on 31 January 1943. The championship began on 4 April 1943 and ended on 7 November 1943.

St. Finbarr's were the defending champions.

On 7 November 1943, St. Finbarr's won the championship following a 7-09 to 1-01 defeat of Ballincollig in a replay of the final. This was their 12th championship title overall and their second title in succession.

Results

First round

St. Finbarr's received a bye in this round.

Second round

Ballincollig, Glen Rovers and University College Cork received byes in this round.

Semi-finals

Finals

Championship statistics

Miscellaneous

The semi-final between St. Finbarr's and Glen Rovers had a record attendance of 18,410.
 Ballincollig become the first team to lose three finals in a row.

References

Cork Senior Hurling Championship
Cork Senior Hurling Championship